West Nash Street Historic District is a national historic district located at Wilson, Wilson County, North Carolina.  It encompasses 79 contributing buildings in a predominantly residential section of Wilson.  The district largely developed during the 1910s and 1920s and includes notable examples of Colonial Revival and Bungalow / American Craftsman style architecture.  Notable buildings include the William W. Graves House, Selby Hurt· Anderson House, Williams-Cozart House, John T. Barnes House, Graham-Woodard House, M. Douglas Aycock House (1925-1928), John D. Gold House, Boykin's Filling Station, and West End Grocery.

It was listed on the National Register of Historic Places in 1984.

Notable residents 
Daisy Hendley Gold, American author and journalist

References

Historic districts on the National Register of Historic Places in North Carolina
Colonial Revival architecture in North Carolina
Geography of Wilson County, North Carolina
National Register of Historic Places in Wilson County, North Carolina